Haya Freedman (1923–2005) was a Polish-born Israeli mathematician known for her research on the Tamari lattice and on ring theory, and as "an exceptionally gifted teacher" of mathematics at the London School of Economics.

Early life and education
Haya Freedman was born in Lviv, which at that time was part of Poland, and at the age of ten moved to Mandatory Palestine. She earned a master's degree from the Hebrew University of Jerusalem, studying abstract algebra there under the supervision of Jacob Levitzki. She began doctoral studies under Dov Tamari in the early 1950s, doing research on the Tamari lattice that she would much later publish with Tamari. However, at that time her husband wanted to shift his own research from mathematics to computer science, and as part of that shift decided to move to England. Freedman moved with him in 1956, breaking off her studies.
Instead, she completed a PhD at Queen Mary College in 1960, under the supervision of Kurt Hirsch.

Academic career
In 1965, Freedman became a faculty member in mathematics in Birkbeck College. In 1966, Cyril Offord founded the sub-department of mathematics at the London School of Economics, and she became one of the founding faculty members there. She retired in 1988.

Legacy
In her honour, the London School of Economics offers an annual prize, the Haya Freedman Prize, for the best dissertation in applied mathematics.

References

1923 births
2005 deaths
Polish mathematicians
Israeli mathematicians
British mathematicians
Women mathematicians
Hebrew University of Jerusalem alumni
Alumni of Queen Mary University of London
Academics of Birkbeck, University of London
Academics of the London School of Economics
Polish emigrants to Mandatory Palestine
Israeli emigrants to the United Kingdom